Lola may refer to:

Places
 Lola Township, Cherokee County, Kansas, United States
 Lola Prefecture, Guinea
 Lola, Guinea, a town in Lola Prefecture
 Lola Island, in the Solomon Islands

People 

 Lola (footballer) (born 1950), Brazilian association football player
 Lola Astanova (born 1985), Uzbek-American pianist
 Lola Beltrán (1932–1996), Mexican singer
 Lola Índigo (born 1992), Spanish singer
 Lola Kutty, alter ego of Indian entertainer Anuradha Menon
 Lola Montez (1821–1861), stage name of Irish-born actress, dancer and courtesan Marie Dolores Eliza Rosanna Gilbert, Countess of Landsfeld 
 Lola Yoʻldosheva (born 1985), Uzbek singer, songwriter and actress

Film and television
 Lola (1961 film), by Jacques Demy
 Lola (1969 film), starring Charles Bronson
 Lola (1974 film), by David Hemmings
 Lola (1981 film), by Rainer Werner Fassbinder
 Lola (2019 film), by Laurent Micheli
 LOLA (2022 film), by Andrew Legge
 Grandmother (2009 film) or Lola, a film by Brillante Mendoza
 Clubbed to Death (film) or Lola, a 1996 French film by Yolande Zauberman
 Lola, a 2001 film by Carl Bessai
 Lola (TV series), a 2008 Greek sitcom
 Lola...Érase una vez, a Mexican telenovela (started 2007)
 Law & Order: LA, or LOLA, a 2010-11 American police and legal TV drama
 Lola Award, the statuette of the German Film Award

Music
 "Lola" (song), a 1970 song by The Kinks
 "Lola" (Iggy Azalea song), 2019
 "Lola", a song by Dana International
 "Lola", a song by Superbus
 "Lola", a song by Mika from The Origin of Love
 Lola, the subject of Barry Manilow's song "Copacabana"
 Lola, a character of the opera Cavalleria rusticana

Other uses 
 Tropical Storm Lola, any of various cyclones
 Lola (computing), a hardware-description language
 LoLa (software), a music performance streaming system
 Lola language, spoken in Indonesia
 Lola Cars, a racing car constructor based in England
 MasterCard Lola, a 1997 racing team
 Ladies of Liberty Alliance
 Lola 8, an early Serbian personal computer
 Lola.com, a Boston-based software as a service company
 Lola, water balloons thrown in Nepal during the Holi festival
 Lola, a hawk mated to Pale Male
 Lola, the cat whose abuse was the subject of noted Internet vigilantism
 Lola, a sweet banana pepper
 Lola (harvestman), a genus of harvestmen in the family Phalangodidae
 Lola, a genus of algae in the family Cladophoraceae, synonym of Rhizoclonium

See also 
 Run Lola Run, a 1998 German film
 "Whatever Lola Wants", a song from the musical Damn Yankees
 LOLA (disambiguation)
 Dolores (disambiguation), a name of which Lola is a diminutive form
 Lolita (disambiguation), a diminutive form of Lola